Bangladesh Navy School and College, Chittagong, is a private primary, secondary and higher secondary school in Chittagong, Bangladesh, which is run by Bangladesh Navy. It is located at Sailors Colony 1, Bandar, Chittagong.

History 
In 1977, the institute was founded in Chittagong as a junior secondary school of the Bangladesh Navy with only about sixty students. It was upgraded to a high school in 1978, and upgraded to a school and college in 1990.

References

External links 

 
 Bangladesh Navy website

High schools in Bangladesh
1977 establishments in Bangladesh
Educational institutions established in 1977
Schools in Chittagong